"Repression" is the 150th episode of the science fiction television series Star Trek: Voyager, and the fourth episode of the seventh (and final) season of the series. The storyline revisits the potential for Starfleet and Maquis conflict explored in "Worst Case Scenario" at the end of season three.

A series of attacks against former Maquis crew members baffles the Voyager senior staff.
This episode explores mind control triggered by a subliminal message and the loyalties of crew members. The friendship between Commander Tuvok and Captain Janeway ultimately overcomes a fanatic's ability to invoke repressed conditioning. A recurring theme is Tuvok's "hunches", which he can neither explain nor ignore.
Another feature of this episode is the Vulcan mind meld being used to force or invoke uncharacteristic behaviour. It is unclear how many of the former Maquis crew members on Voyager had been exposed to the fanatic's mind control techniques. This may be a rare instance of a forced mind meld creating aberrant behaviour in the victim.

This is also the only onscreen mention of the name of Chakotay's Maquis ship, the Val Jean.

Plot

A Bajoran man talks to an image of the starship USS Voyager and chants incantations, as images of Voyager crew, formerly Maquis, appear on his screen.

On board Voyager, Tom Paris and his new wife B'Elanna Torres enter the holodeck recreation of the Palace Theatre in Chicago to watch a classic film. As the film starts, Tom deletes the holographic audience, revealing Tabor (Jad Mager), comatose in the front row. The Doctor finds disruptions in his synaptic pathways, contusions and microfractures. Captain Janeway puts Tuvok in charge of the investigation into the attack. Tuvok's uncharacteristic "hunch" is that someone on Voyager is responsible.

Soon there are five comatose crewmen in Sickbay, with the same injuries, are all former Maquis. Tuvok notes that the assailant must have access to security protocols. Chakotay cautions the other former Maquis: they are to carry hand phasers and go nowhere alone. Meanwhile, Tom Paris and Kim have captured a displaced photon negative image of two humanoid figures on the holodeck – Ensign Tabor and his assailant. Tuvok asks them to increase the resolution of the images and keep him informed. The attacks began after the last data stream from Starfleet, so Tuvok investigates personal messages in that transmission, including a letter to Kim mentioning a friend killed by the Maquis. Kim angrily defends his innocence, and Tuvok becomes strangely perturbed.

In Sickbay, Tabor has revived spontaneously, with no memory of the assault. Tuvok's enigmatic attitude to the investigation seems to disturb Tabor.

Chakotay examines the body of another unconscious crewmember, and is suddenly attacked by Tuvok. Tuvok seems to have no memory of having attacked Chakotay and continues his investigation. The other victims awaken with no memory of what happened to them. Not having slept for three days, Janeway urges Tuvok to rest. As he meditates, he has flashbacks of attacking his victims. In the bathroom he sees the bruise from his fight with Chakotay, then a hallucination of the Bajoran behind his own reflection in the mirror.

Tuvok rushes to the holodeck and realizes that the negative image recorded matches his own description. Tuvok tries to tell Janeway that he is the assailant, but is urged on by visions of the Bajoran. He overcomes the urges and confesses. Janeway visits Tuvok in the brig; he cannot explain why he attacked the Maquis crewmembers, but recalls that the attacks started after he received a letter from his son. They discover the message contained an embedded message of the Bajoran chanting from Teero Anaydis, a fanatic who worked with the Maquis in counter-intelligence, but was thrown out for experimenting with mind control. Tuvok explains that Teero discovered he was spying on the Maquis and subjected him to mind-control experiments. Janeway urges Tuvok to tell her more, but Teero appears to Tuvok and tells him to complete his mission.

Tuvok cannot stay in control of his mind. Tuvok sends Chakotay a command in the Bajoran language. Chakotay then gathers the other victims of Tuvok's attacks and takes control of the ship. Chakotay tests Tuvok, commanding him to fire a phaser at Janeway, but his loyalty to Janeway snaps him out of his compulsion. As Chakotay's back is turned, Tuvok performs a mind meld that returns Chakotay to normal. The other crewmembers recover, and Tuvok joins Janeway and the others at the movies, where Tuvok explains to Janeway that he had a "hunch" that Chakotay would never have given him an operational weapon if he had doubts about his loyalty.

Reception 
In 2020, Gizmodo listed this episode as one of the "must watch" episodes from season seven of the show.

Home media releases 
On December 21, 2003, this episode was released on DVD as part of a Season 7 boxset; Star Trek Voyager: Complete Seventh Season.

See also
 Face of the Enemy (Star Trek: The Next Generation) (Deanna Troi works as a spy)

References

External links
 

Star Trek: Voyager (season 7) episodes
2000 American television episodes
Fiction about mind control